PC Connection, doing business as Connection, is headquartered in Merrimack, New Hampshire. It has more than 2,500 employees and sells more than 300,000 products.

The Connection brand includes Connection Business Solutions, Connection MoreDirect Enterprise Solutions, and Connection GovConnection Public Sector Solutions, which provide IT services for small- to medium-sized businesses, enterprises, and public sector markets, respectively.

History

PC Connection, Inc. was founded in 1982 by Patricia Gallup and David Hall. The co-founders met while serving as a support crew to hikers on the Appalachian Trail.

The company's first headquarters occupied a former woodworking mill in Marlow, NH. To launch their business, Gallup and Hall used Gallup's savings of $8,000 to purchase inventory and take out a 1/9th-page ad in Byte magazine. In 1984, they started selling Macintosh products under the MacConnection brand.

In 1987, PC Connection was named to the Inc. 500 as the second fastest growing company in the United States.

In March 1998, the company completed its initial public offering on the NASDAQ exchange under the symbol PCCC.

In September 2016, the company announced a corporate rebranding. The "Connection" brand unites all subsidiaries (PC Connection, MacConnection, GovConnection, MoreDirect, and Softmart) under one brand name. NASDAQ stock ticker changes from PCCC to CNXN.

Locations

In addition to its corporate headquarters in Merrimack, PC Connection, Inc. has sales and support offices in Keene and Portsmouth, New Hampshire; Marlborough, Massachusetts; Rockville, Maryland; Dakota Dunes, South Dakota; Boca Raton, Florida; Shelton, Connecticut; Exton, Pennsylvania, and Schaumburg, Illinois. The company operates a 268,000-square-foot distribution and fulfillment complex, equipped with a technical configuration lab in Wilmington, Ohio.

Acquisitions

In 1999, Connection purchased ComTeq Federal, a Maryland-based company serving the computing needs of federal government agencies, including the Navy, Federal Deposit Insurance Corp, the National Security Agency, and Internal Revenue Service. Renamed GovConnection, Inc., the subsidiary serves all government and education customers.

In January 2000, Connection announced the agreement to acquire Merisel Inc.

In 2002, Connection acquired MoreDirect, a Florida-based company specializing in Web-based eProcurement.

In 2005, Connection purchased the business and selected assets of Amherst Technologies, Inc., a New Hampshire-based IT provider.

In 2011, Connection acquired ValCom Technologies, a technology services company in the Chicago metropolitan area.

In 2016, Connection acquired Softmart, a supplier of hardware and software.

In 2016, Connection acquired GlobalServe, a global reseller.

References

Technology companies established in 1982
Companies based in Merrimack, New Hampshire
Companies listed on the Nasdaq
1982 establishments in New Hampshire